The Car Care Plan International was a European Tour golf tournament which was played annually from 1982 to 1986. It was hosted by three golf clubs in the English city of Leeds. In 1983 and 1984, it was won by future six time major championship winner Nick Faldo. In 1986 the prize fund was £100,000, which was one of the smallest on the European Tour that year.

Winners

External links
Coverage on the European Tour's official site

Former European Tour events
Golf tournaments in England
Sport in Leeds